Carlos Carrizo Salvadores is a retired Argentine Army middle-rank officer and former police chief of Jujuy Province in Argentina.

Formative years

Carrizo Salvadores was born on 7 August 1944 in San Miguel de Tucumán. His parents resettled in Catamarca soon after his birth. As a child, he spent his formative years at Colegio Belgrano{.

Early career

Carlos Carrizo Salvadores enrolled in the Colegio Militar de la Nación in 1959 as an officer cadet and entered the Argentine Army in 1962, as an infantry second lieutenant. Before being promoted to captain in 1974, he passed paratroop qualification as a full lieutenant and was transferred to the 4th Airborne Infantry Brigade where he served as a company commander with the 17th Airborne Infantry Regiment.

Falklands War

Major Carlos Carrizo Salvadores distinguished himself in the Battle of Mount Longdon, during the Falklands War, when as Second-in-Command of the 7th Mechanized Infantry Regiment, he defended the Argentine stronghold overlooking Murrel River and later led a platoon of conscripts to recover the lost positions on Wireless Ridge. During the battle for Mount Longdon and Wireless Ridge, the attacking British Paratroopers had to several times take part in close quarter combat, taking heavy casualties in what is still regarded as the bloodiest British ground action since the Korean War.

References

1944 births
Living people
20th-century Argentine military personnel